Marta Lipińska (born 14 May 1940) is a Polish actress. She appeared in more than 40 films and television shows since 1962.

Selected filmography
 Katastrofa (1965)
 Salto (1965)
 Nad Niemnem (1986)

References

External links

1940 births
Living people
Polish film actresses
People from Boryslav
Ukrainian Soviet Socialist Republic people
Polish stage actresses
Polish television actresses
Recipients of the Order of Polonia Restituta
Recipient of the Meritorious Activist of Culture badge